Titus Flavius Vespasianus may refer to two Roman emperors:

 The elder Titus Flavius Vespasianus, who took the name  Caesar Vespasianus Augustus, and is better known in English as the emperor Vespasian
 his son, Titus Flavius Vespasianus, known as the emperor Titus

Flavii